Hada may refer to:

 Hada, or Khata, traditional ceremonial scarf used in Tibet and Mongolia
 Hada (surname), a Japanese and Romanian surname
 Hada (activist), Mongol activist advocating for the separation of Inner Mongolia from the People's Republic of China
 Hada (clan), clan of Rajputs, a branch of the Chauhan clan of agnivanshi rajputs
 Hada (moth), a moth genus
 Hyderabad Airport Development Authority
 Hada, a village of the Kwakwaka'wakw that had been at what is now Ahta Indian Reserve No. 3 on the Coast of British Columbia, Canada

See also
Hadda (disambiguation)
Haida (disambiguation)